José Luis Villanueva Ahumada (born November 5, 1981) is a Chilean former footballer who played as a forward .

Club career

Second Division in Chile 
In 2001, Chilean first division side Palestino loaned Villanueva out to second division squad Deportes Temuco, where he scored seven goals and helped the club gain promotion to the first division. The following year, instead of returning to Palestino, Villanueva was again loaned out, this time to second division club Deportes Ovalle. In 2002, Villanueva scored 20 goals with Ovalle.

Palestino 
After the 2002 campaign, Villanueva was called to stay with his original team in first division. Villanueva continued his goal-scoring during the 2003 season with Palestino by scoring 22 goals in 34 matches, including in the Pre-Sudamericana Cup. After the season, Palestino once again loaned Villanueva out, this time to Universidad Católica. From 2004 to 2005, Villanueva scored 16 more goals.

Out of Chile 
Palestino sold him to Argentine side Racing Club in 2005 for $600,000, immediately becoming a fan favourite. In a match against Quilmes, Villanueva scored two goals to lead Racing Club to a 4–1 victory. With less than a minute left in the match, Villanueva was substituted off. As he left the pitch, the fans could be heard chanting "shileno, shileno", just how River Plate fans had chanted for Chilean legend Marcelo Salas and Alexis Sánchez years prior.

Villanueva then had spells in South Korea for Ulsan Hyundai in 2007 and in Brazil for Vasco da Gama in 2008 before moving to Uzbekistan. In Tashkent based club Bunyodkor, he played under number 17. During AFC Champions League he couldn’t participate in the competition due to the limit of foreign players as Rivaldo, Victor and Ramos were chosen.

International career 
Villanueva represented Chile internationally at the under-20 level at the 2001 South American U-20 Championship and under-23 level during the preolympic qualifications in 2004, and represented the adult squad since 2003.

After football 
After his retirement, he continued playing football at amateur level for the club Alianza of La Reina.  At the same time, he writes a popular "opinion piece" about football in PrensaFútbol.com and works as a football commentator in both TV and radio programs. Currently, he works for both ESPN Chile and Radio Pauta.

Since 2016, he has an undertaking called "The Football Experience" which helps amateur football players to live an experience as a professional footballer, organizing matches around the world.

Personal life 
He also is married with 30-year-old journalist, Fernanda Bünzli. He likes to travel around the world and he hopes he could write in the future about his experiences. He hopes to end his career with his favorite Chilean squad Universidad Católica and then study a professional career.

Honours

Club
Bunyodkor
Uzbek League: 2008
Uzbek Cup: 2008

Universidad Católica
Copa Chile (1): 2011

References

External links
 

1981 births
Living people
Chilean footballers
Chile international footballers
Chile under-20 international footballers
Chilean expatriate footballers
Club Deportivo Palestino footballers
Deportes Temuco footballers
Deportes Ovalle footballers
Cobreloa footballers
Club Deportivo Universidad Católica footballers
Racing Club de Avellaneda footballers
Atlético Morelia players
Ulsan Hyundai FC players
CR Vasco da Gama players
FC Bunyodkor players
Tianjin Jinmen Tiger F.C. players
C.D. Antofagasta footballers
Deportes Magallanes footballers
Magallanes footballers
Chilean Primera División players
Primera B de Chile players
Argentine Primera División players
Liga MX players
K League 1 players
Campeonato Brasileiro Série A players
Uzbekistan Super League players
Chinese Super League players
Primera Nacional players
Expatriate footballers in Argentina
Chilean expatriate sportspeople in Argentina
Expatriate footballers in Mexico
Chilean expatriate sportspeople in Mexico
Expatriate footballers in South Korea
Chilean expatriate sportspeople in South Korea
Expatriate footballers in Brazil
Chilean expatriate sportspeople in Brazil
Expatriate footballers in Uzbekistan
Chilean expatriate sportspeople in Uzbekistan
Expatriate footballers in China
Chilean expatriate sportspeople in China
Footballers from Santiago
Association football forwards
Association football commentators
Chilean association football commentators